Frederick Gresham Pollard (May 7, 1918 – July 7, 2003) of Richmond, Virginia was a lawyer and politician. He served in  the Virginia House of Delegates and was the 29th Lieutenant Governor of the Commonwealth of Virginia.

Early life and family

Fred G. Pollard was born to Robert Nelson Pollard and the former Mary Faulkner Butler. He attended Richmond Public Schools and the Episcopal High School before enrolling at the University of Virginia.  He graduated with a BA in 1940 and an LLB in 1942.  During World War II, Pollard served in the United States Naval Reserve.  He subsequently entered the practice of law and later joined the firm of Williams Mullen, with whom he continued to work throughout his life.

Pollard had a brother, Robert Nelson Pollard, Jr. and a sister, Mary Butler (Polly) Pollard Buford.  He was married three times, with the marriages producing four children and four step-children.

He is buried in Hollywood Cemetery, Richmond, Virginia.

Politics 

Pollard represented parts of Henrico County and Richmond in the Virginia House of Delegates from 1950 to 1965, when he was elected lieutenant governor.  Pollard ran for governor in 1969, but lost in the Democratic primary.

References

1918 births
2003 deaths
Lieutenant Governors of Virginia
Democratic Party members of the Virginia House of Delegates
University of Virginia alumni
University of Virginia School of Law alumni
Virginia lawyers
Politicians from Richmond, Virginia
20th-century American politicians
Lawyers from Richmond, Virginia
20th-century American lawyers